Funkghost (born Alvin Augustus Harris on June 26, 1972) is an American hip-hop artist/producer from Tampa, Florida.

Biography
Funkghost was born in Newport News, Virginia on June 26, 1972. In 1986, his family relocated to Tampa, Florida. After graduation from Bloomingdale High School in 1990, he began performing in and around Tampa's Ybor City commercial district with various bands/DJ's helping form the emerging hip hop scene in the Tampa Bay Area.

Career
Funkghost began his career in the early 1990s as a studio apprentice under the tutelage of keyboard/organ player Edwin Birdsong, who had worked extensively in the 1970s and early 1980s with Jazz Musician Roy Ayers.

In the summer of 1999, Funkghost traveled to New York City and collaborated with Tampa Native Celph Titled who at the time was working as an in-house producer and A&R for the now-defunct BUDS International and Bronx Science Records. They would go on to release Funkghost's 1st 12' single "Instructions" b/w "Tampa International".

In 2000 Funkghost released his debut LP "Ultra Boogie Highlife". The LP was well received by critics Urban Smarts | Entertainment Music but failed commercially. Only 20,000 copies were circulated. Ultra-Boogie Highlife is now considered a hard to find Cult Classic. The album cover for Ultra-Boogie Highlife features a young and (at the time unknown) Real World alumna Melissa Howard. In early 2009 he formed his own independent imprint "Grand Extravagant Entertainment" and released the single and video "The Way I Rock My Clothes" in February 2009. The song was produced by Symbolyc One "S1"  who would go on to co-produce Kanye West's 2010 single "Power" a year later. "The Way I Rock My Clothes" was well received by critics and has since garnered mix show airplay on FM stations across the United States. On July 1, 2009, Funkghost released the single and video for "Vintage Futuristic". The song was produced by Australian hip hop producer M-Phazes. "Vintage Futuristic" spawned several remixes and again, was well received by critics. On April 19, 2010, Funkghost released the single and music video for "I'm Your DJ". The song was produced, written, arranged and performed by Funkghost. Although a critical success, "I'm Your DJ" was not a significant commercial success. On September 5, 2010, Funkghost teamed up with music video director Jason Colvin (who directed his "I'm Your DJ" Music Video) and released a short film to his song "As Long As You Rock". The song "As Long As You Rock" again was produced, written, arranged and performed by Funkghost. On October 31, 2014 Funkghost released his second full- length studio album entitled Caviar Taste.

2020–present: Illsboro Records, "Life is how you paint it" LP

In March 2020, Funkghost signed 2 distribution deals with Illsboro Records/Symphonic and Hiphopenterprise based in Antwerp, Belgium. Illsboro – Record label based in Tampa  In October 2020, Funkghost announced the upcoming release of his 3rd album entitled "Life is how you paint it". The album is slated to be released early 2021 on Illsboro Records/Symphonic. In September 2020, Belgium-based indie label HipHopEnterprise re-issued Funkghost's classic debut LP "Ultra Boogie Highlife" on limited edition collectors vinyl and CD's.

Personal life
Funkghost has two daughters. Lilani Zen Mendoza-Harris born on October 30, 2013 and Anastazia Isley Mendoza-Harris born July 10, 2018.

Discography
 Ultra Boogie Highlife LP (2000)
 Caviar Taste LP (2014)

References

 In our own back yard By GINA VIVINETTO and SAMANTHA SPINRAD, Times Staff Writers
 St. Petersburg Times, published March 31, 2000 
 Hivestock returns for another spin St. Petersburg Times
Author: MICHAEL PATRICK WELCH 
Published Date: Dec 22, 1999 
 Funkghost: Confidence Man By Colin Kincaid REAX Magazine volume 03 issue 11 // Published April 1, 2009
 The Grand Extravagant Update By Delasoulous Published 4-26-2009 HiphoPolitico
 Funkghost: Tampa's Independent Sun!! Interview on www.beatdynasty.com By Jay Williams
 Artist of the day: Funkghost  By Jay Cridlin Staff writer Tampa Bay Times March 24, 2009
 95.7 The Beat FM DJ Sandman 95.7 FM Playlist Sat 03-28-09
 iStandard alumni Funkghost & S1 team up for new project By Don. Posted March 31, 2009
 Urbansmarts.com Review of Ultra-Boogie Highlife Posted By Tadah the byk
 Fluid Friday Posted by Delasoulous 4-24-09 hiphopolitico
 Bridging The Gap Funkghost Interview on Jibba Jabba w/Jill
 Mikey McFly "Vintage Futuristic" Review
 Tampa Bay's 10 Most Stylish By Nicole Hutcheson Tampa Bay Times Staff Writer
  By Jason Steele, Robert Benfer, and Chris Alex

External links 
 Official Website
 Funkghost Media Blog
 The World According To Funkghost
 Myspace
 Twitter

Record producers from Virginia
Record producers from Florida
1972 births
Living people
Musicians from Tampa, Florida
Musicians from Newport News, Virginia